Sport Clube Vianense (abbreviated as SC Vianense) is a Portuguese football club based in Viana do Castelo in the district of Viana do Castelo. SC Vianense currently plays in the Campeonato de Portugal. The club was founded in 1898 and is one of the oldest clubs in Portugal. They play their home matches at the Estádio do Dr. José de Matos in Viana do Castelo. The stadium has a capacity of 3,000 spectators.

The club is affiliated to Associação de Futebol de Viana do Castelo and has competed in the Viana do Castelo championship. The club has also entered the national cup competition known as Taça de Portugal on many occasions. It reached the semifinals of its forerunner, the Campeonato de Portugal in 1924, its third edition.

The football team is run by their SAD, which was purchased in 2022 by Gary Raulino, owner of Canadian team Scrosoppi FC of League1 Ontario, who owns 80% of the SAD, with the club retaining the remaining 20%.

Season to season

League and cup history

The second ranking on the recent seasons represents rankings from the playoffs/final phase competitions.

Honours
Terceira Divisão: 1998/99 (Série A)
Campeonato de Viana do Castelo: 	1923/24, 1924/25, 1925/26, 1926/27, 1927/28, 1928/29, 1929/30, 1930/31, 1931/32, 1932/33, 1933/34, 1934/35, 1935/36, 1936/37, 1939/40, 1940/41, 1941/42

Notable former managers
 Rogério Gonçalves

See also
Scrosoppi FC
Official website

References

 
Football clubs in Portugal
Association football clubs established in 1898
SC Vianense